Guy Ardilouze (27 January 1908 – 8 December 1944) was a French architect. His work was part of the architecture event in the art competition at the 1948 Summer Olympics.

References

1908 births
1944 deaths
20th-century French architects
Olympic competitors in art competitions
People from Gers
Victims of aviation accidents or incidents in France
Victims of aviation accidents or incidents in 1944